Edward Shuter (c. 1728–1776) was an English actor.

Life
Shuter was born in London to poor parents.
He made his first appearance on the London stage in 1745 in Cibber's Schoolboy. 

He made a great reputation in old men's parts. 
He was the original Justice Woodcock in Love in a Village (1762), Hardcastle in She Stoops to Conquer (1773), and Sir Anthony Absolute in The Rivals (1775).

He was buried in St. Paul's, Covent Garden.

Portraits
His portrait as Scapin is in the Mathews collection in the Garrick Club; another portrait by Zoffany was engraved by Finlayson.

References

Attribution:

; Endnotes:
Genest's Account of the English Stage
Doran's Annals of the Stage, ed. Lowe
 Davies's Dramatick Miscellanies
 Clark Russell's Representative Actors
 Dibdin's History of the Stage
 Boaden's Memoirs of Mrs. Siddons, and Life of Mrs. Jordan
 O'Keeffe's Recollections
 Garrick Correspondence
 Dramatic Mirror
 Thespian Dict.
 Georgian Era
 The Dramatic History of Master Edward, Miss Ann, Mr. Llwhuddwhydd, and others, the extraordinaries of these times. Collected from Zaphaniel's original papers, illustrated with copper-plates, London, 1743 [should be 1763], 12mo, a scarce work by G. A. Stevens, in imitation of Sterne's style, was aimed particularly at Shuter and Nancy Dawson; it was several times reprinted (Brit. Mus. Cat. 1785 and 1786).

1728 births
1776 deaths
English male stage actors
18th-century English male actors